The RIM-66 Standard MR (SM-1MR/SM-2MR) is a medium-range surface-to-air missile (SAM), with a secondary role as an anti-ship missile, originally developed for the United States Navy (USN). A member of the Standard Missile family of weapons, the SM-1 was developed as a replacement for the RIM-2 Terrier and RIM-24 Tartar that were deployed in the 1950s on a variety of USN ships. The RIM-67 Standard (SM-1ER/SM-2ER) is an extended range version of this missile with a solid rocket booster stage.

Description
The Standard missile program was started in 1963 to produce a family of missiles to replace existing guided missiles used by the Terrier, Talos, and Tartar guided missile systems. The intention was to produce a new generation of guided missiles that could be retrofit to existing guided missile systems.

Standard Missile 1
The RIM-66A is the medium ranged version of the Standard missile and was initially developed as a replacement for the earlier RIM-24C as part of the Mk74 "Tartar" Guided Missile Fire Control System. It used the same fuselage as the earlier Tartar missile, for easier use with existing launchers and magazines for that system. The RIM-66A/B while looking like the earlier RIM-24C on the exterior is a different missile internally with redesigned electronics and a more reliable homing system and fuze that make it more capable than its predecessor. The RIM-66A/B Standard MR, (SM-1MR Block I to V) was used during the Vietnam War. The only remaining version of the Standard missile 1 in service is the RIM-66E (SM-1MR Block VI). While no longer in service with the USN, the RIM-66E is still in service with many navies globally and is expected to remain in service until 2020.

Standard Missile 2
The RIM-66C/D Standard MR (SM-2MR Block I) was developed in the 1970s and was a key part of the Aegis combat system and New Threat Upgrade (NTU). The SM-2MR introduced inertial and command mid-course guidance. The missile's autopilot is programmed to fly the most efficient path to the target and can receive course corrections from the ground. Target illumination for semi-active homing is needed only for a few seconds in the terminal phase of the interception. This capability enables the Aegis combat system and New Threat Upgrade equipped vessels to time share illumination radars, greatly increasing the number of targets that can be engaged in quick succession.

The SM-1 and SM-2 were continuously upgraded through Blocks.

In the middle 1980s, the SM-2MR was deployed via Mk 41 Vertical Launch System (VLS) aboard , the first U.S. Navy ship to deploy a vertical launcher. VLS has, since 2003, been the only launcher used for the Standard missile in the U.S. Navy aboard s and s. They are now most commonly launched from the Mk 41 VLS, which is a modular design concept with different versions that vary in size and weight.

The Standard can also be used against ships, either at line-of-sight range using its semi-active homing mode, or over the horizon using inertial guidance and terminal infrared homing.

The SM-2 has conducted more than 2,700 successful live firings. In June 2017, Raytheon announced it was restarting the SM-2 production line to fulfill purchases made by the Netherlands, Japan, Australia, and South Korea. Production had stopped in 2013 from lack of international orders. New deliveries of SM-2 Block IIIA and IIIB missiles are scheduled to begin in 2020. The United States Navy is committed to keeping the Standard Missile 2 medium-range viable until 2035.

Contractors
Standard missiles were constructed by General Dynamics Pomona Division until 1992, when it became part of the Hughes Missile Systems Company. Hughes formed a joint venture with Raytheon called Standard Missile Company (SMCo). Hughes Missile Systems was eventually sold to Raytheon making it the sole contractor.

Due to the end of the US Navy's support of the SM-1 missile system the National Chung-Shan Institute of Science and Technology has taken over support for the system in Taiwanese service including production of replacement rocket motors. The same approach was taken for the SM-1's Mark 13 missile launcher.

Operational history
The Standard missile one became operational in 1968. The missile was utilized by ships equipped with the Tartar Guided Missile Fire Control System. The missile saw its first combat use in the early 1970s in the Vietnam war.

The Standard Missile Two became operational in the late 1970s and was deployed operationally with the Aegis Combat System in 1983. Both Standard one and two were used against both surface and air targets during Operation Praying Mantis. On July 3, 1988,  mistakenly shot down Iran Air Flight 655, an Airbus A300B2, using two SM-2MRs from her forward launcher. In 1988 the Iranian Kaman-class missile boat Joshan was disabled by RIM-66s during Operation Praying Mantis.

On 9 October 2016, the Arleigh Burke-class destroyer  fired two SM-2s, as well as one Evolved Sea Sparrow Missile, at two incoming Houthi anti-ship missiles off the coast of Yemen, one of which struck the water on its own. It is unknown if the SM-2s were responsible for intercepting the second cruise missile. On 12 October, Mason again came under attack by an anti-ship missile, and an SM-2 she fired was confirmed to have intercepted it at a range of 8 miles. This marked the first time in history a warship successfully defended itself with SAMs against an anti-ship missile. The ship experienced yet a third attack on 15 October, this time with 5 AShMs. She fired SM-2s, destroying four of the missiles.

On 1 April 2020, a Turkish Navy G-class frigate fired at least a SM-1MR Block VIA RIM-66E-05 supposedly against an UAV operated in support of the Libyan National Army. The missile missed and landed near al-Ajaylat, just southwest of Sabratha.

Deployment history
The Standard missile is designated by blocks depending upon their technological package.

SM-1 Medium Range Block I/II/III/IV, RIM-66A
The First Standard missiles entered service in the USN in 1967. Blocks I, II, and III were preliminary versions. Block IV was the production version. This missile was a replacement for the earlier RIM-24C Tartar missile.

SM-1 Medium Range Block V, RIM-66B
The RIM-66B introduced changes that resulted in higher reliability. A new faster reacting autopilot, a more powerful dual thrust rocket motor, and a new warhead were added. Many RIM-66A missiles were re-manufactured into RIM-66B.

SM-1 Medium Range Blocks VI/VIA/VIB, RIM-66E
The RIM-66E was the last version of the standard missile one medium-range. This version entered service in 1983 with the United States Navy and export customers. The RIM-66E was used by all remaining Tartar vessels that were not modified to use the New Threat Upgrade and s which controlled it with the Mk92 fire control system. Production of this missile ended in 1987. The missile was retired from USN service in 2003; however there are a large number of this model in service abroad and it is expected to remain viable until 2020.

SM-2 Medium Range Block I, RIM-66C/D
The RIM-66C was the first version of the Standard missile two. The RIM-66D was the SM-2 medium-range block I version for the New Threat Upgrade. The SM-2 incorporates a new autopilot giving it inertial guidance in all phases of flight except for the terminal intercept where semi-active radar homing is still used. This version is no longer in service; remaining missiles have either been remanufactured into later models or have been put in storage.

SM-2 Medium Range Block II, RIM-66G/H/J
The Block II missile was introduced in 1983 with a new rocket motor for longer range and a new warhead. The RIM-66G is for the Aegis combat system and the Mk26 missile launcher. The RIM-66H is for Aegis and the Mk41 vertical launcher. The RIM-66J is the version for the New Threat Upgrade. Block II missiles are no longer manufactured, and have been withdrawn from service. The remainder have either been put in storage, scrapped for spare parts, or remanufactured into later models.

SM-2 Medium Range Block III/IIIA/IIIB, RIM-66K/L/M
The RIM-66M is the version of the Standard missile two medium-range (SM-2MR) currently in service with the USN aboard Ticonderoga-class cruisers and s. The missile is specifically designed for the Aegis Combat System and the Mk41 Vertical launch system. The Block III missiles differ from earlier blocks by the addition of the MK 45 MOD 9 target detecting device, for improved performance against low altitude targets. The Block IIIB missile additionally has a dual semi-active/infrared seeker for terminal homing. The dual seeker is intended for use in high-ECM environments, against targets over the horizon or with a small radar cross section. The seeker was originally developed for the canceled AIM-7R Sparrow air-to-air missile. All USN Block III and IIIA missiles are to be upgraded to Block IIIB. Block IIIA missiles are operated by the Japanese Maritime Self-Defense Force on its  and  Aegis destroyers. Aegis equipped vessels in the Spanish and South Korean navies use it as well. The Dutch and German Navies have added it to the Anti-Air Warfare system, which uses the Thales Group Active Phased Array Radar S-1850M and Smart-L radar. South Korean KDX-II destroyers use the block IIIA with a New Threat Upgrade compatible guided missile fire control system. Block III variants for Aegis and arm launchers are designated RIM-66L. Block III missiles for New Threat Upgrade systems are designated RIM-66K. Block IIIB missiles were not produced for the New Threat Upgrade. Blocks IIIA and IIIB are the current production versions. The Thales Nederland STIR 1.8 and 2.4 fire control systems are also supported.

SM-2 Medium Range Block IIIC Active 
The Naval Sea Systems Command has announced its intentions to develop an active terminal homing version of the SM-2 MR missile.  This will incorporate the active homing seeker of the SM-6 ERAM into the existing SM-2 airframe.  The Raytheon Company will be awarded contracts for the STANDARD Missile-2 Block IIIC EMD and LRIP requirements on a sole source basis.

Deployment

In the US Navy, RIM-66 Standard was deployed on ships of the following classes, replacing RIM-24 Tartar in some cases:
  (Mk74 Missile Fire Control)
  (Mk74 Missile Fire Control)
  (Mk 92 Missile Fire Control)
  (Mk74 Missile Fire Control SM-1/later New Threat Upgrade for SM-2)
  (Mk74 Missile Fire Control SM-1/later New Threat Upgrade for SM-2)
  (Mk74 Missile Fire Control SM-1/later New Threat Upgrade for SM-2)
  (Aegis Combat System )
 

RIM-66 has also been widely exported and is in service in other navies worldwide.

Variants

Table sources, reference material:

Land Attack Standard Missile
The RGM-165 LASM, also given the designation SM-4, was intended as means to give long-range precision fires in support of the US Marine Corps. Intended as an adaptation of the RIM-66, it retained the original MK 125 warhead and MK 104 rocket motor, with the radar seeker replaced by GPS/INS guidance. While test fired in 1997 using three modified RIM-66K SM-2MR Block III missiles, with 800 missiles set for replacement and IOC expected for 2003/2004, it was cancelled in 2002 due to limited capabilities against mobile or hardened targets.

Operators

Current operators

Royal Australian Navy (Onboard s)

Chilean Navy (Onboard s)

Royal Danish Navy (Onboard  air defense frigates)

Egyptian Navy (Onboard s)

German Navy (Onboard  air defense frigates)

Islamic Republic of Iran Navy operates Sayyad-2 version on frigates and on Kaman/Sina-class missile boats.

Italian Navy (Onboard s)

Royal Netherlands Navy (Onboard s)

Polish Navy (onboard s)

Pakistan Navy (onboard s)

Republic of Korea Navy (onboard  & s)

Spanish Navy (onboard  & s)

ROC Navy (onboard  & s, s). Some SM-1 have been upgraded by NCSIST with an improved propulsion section and an active seeker.

Turkish Navy (Onboard s)
 
United States Navy  (Onboard s).

Former operators

Royal Canadian Navy (Onboard s)

French Navy (onboard s 1988–2021)

Hellenic Navy (onboard s 1991-2004)

See also

Related development
 AGM-78 Standard ARM
 RIM-67 Standard

Similar role
 Aster (missile family)
 Barak 8
 RIM-8 Talos
 Sea Dart
 Masurca
 List of United States Navy Guided Missile Launching Systems

References

External links 

Raytheon Standard missile website, mfr of Standard missiles
Navy Fact file - Standard Missile 2 
NAVAIR War fighters encyclopedia - Standard missile
Designation systems.net RIM-66
FAS - SM-2
GlobalSecurity.org - SM-2

Cold War surface-to-air missiles of the United States
Naval surface-to-air missiles of the United States
Raytheon Company products
Military equipment introduced in the 1960s